Jaimie Lauren Alexander (born Jaimie Lauren Tarbush; March 12, 1984) is an American actress. She is known for portraying Jessi on the TV series Kyle XY and Lady Sif in the Marvel Cinematic Universe films Thor (2011), Thor: The Dark World (2013), and Thor: Love and Thunder (2022), as well as the television series Agents of S.H.I.E.L.D. (2013–2020) and the Disney+ series Loki (2021). From 2015 until 2020, she starred in the NBC series Blindspot.

Early life
Jaimie Alexander was born in Greenville, South Carolina, but moved to Grapevine, Texas, when she was four years old. She is the only girl in a family of five children. Alexander first got into acting in grade school, where she took theater for fun. Alexander stated that she was kicked out of theater when she was in high school because she could not sing, so she instead went into sports. When she was 17, she substituted for a friend at a meeting with a scouting agency and she met her manager, Randy James, who sent her some scripts. After her graduation from Colleyville Heritage High School, a year and a half later, she moved to Los Angeles to pursue her acting career.

Career
Her career was launched in 2003, when she was cast in the leading role of Hanna Thompson in the low budget, award-winning film The Other Side. According to the movie's commentary, she was originally at the audition to help out by reading against the male actors, but the director Gregg Bishop decided to cast her in the leading role after hearing her perform the lines. Alexander's next role was in the movie Squirrel Trap where she played Sara, the love interest of the main character, David, who is a socially introverted genius portrayed by Keith Staley. This was soon followed by a guest appearance in It's Always Sunny in Philadelphia, where she portrayed a femme fatale in the role of Tammy, who through a combination of seduction and threats manipulates one of the main characters. She also has a small part in an episode of Standoff.

She appeared in the series Watch Over Me where she portrayed the character of Caitlin Porter. In 2006, she had her second lead role in the horror film Rest Stop where she portrayed Nicole Carrow, a girl who escapes from home and goes on a trip with her boyfriend, which is unexpectedly interrupted at a rest stop by a deranged serial killer. In 2007, she had her third lead role, also in a horror film. In Hallowed Ground she played Elizabeth Chambers, a girl stranded in a small town inhabited by a sect that plans to use her as a vessel for the rebirth of their founder.

In 2007, she began starring in the ABC Family television show Kyle XY as Jessi, a troubled show-off with superhuman powers who is trying to find her way in the world, with increasing cooperation and eventual romance with her male counterpart Kyle. Her role generated a large fan base hoping to see a spin-off show for her character. She also has had guest roles on the show CSI: Miami where she played Jenna York, a flight attendant involved in a murder case; and in Bones where she played Molly Briggs, a student connected to the victim of the episode.

In September 2009, Alexander was cast as Lady Sif in the live-action superhero film, Thor, directed by Kenneth Branagh and released in May 2011. She reprised the role in the sequel Thor: The Dark World, released in November 2013. She reprised the role twice in special crossover guest appearances in the TV series Agents of S.H.I.E.L.D. on March 11, 2014, and again on March 10, 2015.

In July 2010, Alexander was cast in the independent comedy-drama film, Loosies co-starring Peter Facinelli and directed by Michael Corrente. In October 2010, Alexander joined the cast of Nurse Jackie in a sizeable story arc as Jackie's (Edie Falco) wild, immature sister-in-law, Tunie Peyton. In 2011, she joined the cast of Covert Affairs for three episodes of the second season.

Alexander appeared in the 2013 film Savannah directed by Annette Haywood-Carter, about Ward Allen (Jim Caviezel), a real-life early 1900s aristocrat who starts an unexpected partnership with Christmas Moultrie (Chiwetel Ejiofor), a freed slave. She portrayed deputy sheriff Sarah Torrance in The Last Stand, alongside Arnold Schwarzenegger.

In 2015, Alexander began starring as Jane Doe in the NBC series Blindspot. She made an uncredited cameo appearance as Sif in the TV series Loki in June 2021 and voiced the character in the TV series What If...?. She reprised the role in Thor: Love and Thunder.

Other projects
She also appeared in a Matthew Perryman Jones music video of the song "Save You" released in September 2009.

In 2010, Alexander appeared in a web series for MSN entitled Ultradome produced by Milo Ventimiglia. In the series, Alexander portrayed Han Solo in battle against Indiana Jones for the title of best Harrison Ford character.

In 2011, Alexander reunited with writer/director Gregg Bishop for The Birds of Anger for NBCUniversal G4Films. The film was based on the best-selling mobile game, Rovio's Angry Birds, told in the style of the 1963 film The Birds by Alfred Hitchcock. In 2019, the film was selected by Robert Rodriguez to be featured on his El Rey Network.

Personal life
Alexander began dating actor Peter Facinelli in 2012 after they met on the set of Loosies. They became engaged in March 2015. In February 2016, Alexander and Facinelli announced they had ended their engagement.

Also in 2012, Alexander suffered severe injuries when she slipped off a metal staircase during a rainy morning on the Thor: The Dark World set. The fall caused her to slip a disc in her thoracic spine and chip 11 of her vertebrae, as well as dislocate her left shoulder and tear a rhomboid on her right side. The injuries took her out of filming for a month.

Additionally, during the filming of Blindspot, Alexander experienced many injuries, including: ruptured C6 and C7 discs from being water boarded; herniated T3, T4, T8 and T9 discs; broken nose; dislocated right shoulder; broken right index finger; broken left foot; broken left two toes three times; broken right foot; broken right two toes; dislocated jaw; and other injuries that she was not allowed to disclose.

In March 2018, Alexander was hospitalized and underwent surgery after her appendix ruptured. She later recovered.

Filmography

Film

Television

Video game

Awards and nominations

References

External links 

 
 

1984 births
Living people
21st-century American actresses
Actors from Greenville, South Carolina
Actresses from South Carolina
Actresses from Texas
American film actresses
American television actresses
Colleyville Heritage High School alumni
People from Grapevine, Texas